"Det är över nu" is a song written by Per Gessle, and recorded by Gyllene Tider, released as a single on 8 May 1995. The single peaked at number eleven on the Swedish Singles Chart. The song also became a Trackslistan hit, landing at number 65 on its Melody year-end chart. The song also charted at Svensktoppen, reaching ninth position on both 15 and 22 July 1995.

Track listing
Det är över nu - 3:47
Solens vän - 4:02

Charts

References

External links

1995 singles
Gyllene Tider songs
Songs written by Per Gessle
1995 songs
Parlophone singles